Saint Gaudiosus of Naples or Gaudiosus the African was a bishop of Abitina (Abitine, Abitinia; Abitinae article) in Africa Province during the 5th century AD Abitina was a village near Carthage in present-day western Tunisia.

Born Septimius Celius Gaudiosus, he fled North Africa during the persecutions of Genseric, king of the Vandals, in a leaky boat and arrived at Naples with other exiled churchmen, including the bishop of Carthage, who was named Quodvultdeus.  Arriving around 439 AD, he established himself on the acropolis of Naples.

The introduction of the Augustinian Rule into Naples is attributed to him as well as the introduction of some relics, including those of Saint Restituta.

Gaudiosus' relics were later buried in the Catacombs of San Gennaro in the 6th century.  One of the cemeteries of these catacombs, San Gaudioso, refers to Gaudiosus.

References

External links
The Official Site of the Catacombs of Naples
Gaudiosus of Naples
 San Gaudioso di Abitine

Saints from Roman Africa (province)
5th-century bishops in Roman North Africa
Saints from the Vandal Kingdom
455 deaths
5th-century Christian saints
5th-century Italian bishops
Year of birth unknown